George Wood (born 16 October 1981 in Deal) is an English actor, singer, songwriter and composer, best known for his role of Ollie in the TV series I Dream.

Bio 

Wood speaks French (proficient) and Italian (conversational). He has also advanced football and contemporary dance skills.

Television 

 I Dream: Ollie (leading role, 2004)
 The Dotted Line: Mike (leading role, 2003)
 Anythings Possible: Christopher Dean (leading role, 1997)
 Disney Club: Main Presenter (1996–1997)
 Road Hog: Main Presenter (1996–1997)

Filmography 

 Leonardo's Shadow: Giacomo (leading role, 2006)
 Annie: A Royal Adventure!: Michael Webb (supporting role, 1995)

Theater

Writer 

 Cinderella: Prince (Richmond Theatre, Richmond, 2007–2008)

Actor 

 Deep Blue Sea: Philip Welch (Vaudeville Theatre, 2008)
 Cinderella: Prince (Milton Keynes Theatre, Milton Keynes, 2006–2007)
 The Wizard of Oz: Tinman (Marlowe Theatre, Canterbury, 2006)
 Little Women: Laurie (TheatreWorks, 2005–2006)
 Cinderella: Prince (Churchill Theatre, Bromley, 2005–2006)
 The Mystery Plays: Jesus (Canterbury Cathedral, 2004)
 Snow White and the Seven Dwarfs: Prince (Marlowe Theatre, Canterbury, 2003–2004)
 Sound of Music: Rolf (Aberystwyth Arts Centre, 2002)
 Oliver!: Dipper (London Palladium, 1996)
 Peter Pan (Tour): John Darling (Manchester Palace, Cork Opera House, His Majestys Aberdeen, Belfast Opera House, 1995)

Music

Writer 

 CD Demo (8 tracks, one featured in I Dream)

Singer 

 Say It's Alright (solo single, 2005)
 I Dream Cast Album (3 solo tracks, 2004)
 Promotional tour and performances on Top of the Pops, Blue Peter, Smile & Children in Need

Commercials 

 Clearasil (2002)
 Gran Dorado (1998)
 Frutini-Del Monte (1996)

Radio 
 First Steps in Drama (BBC, 1995)

References

External links 
 

English male television actors
English pop singers
English songwriters
English composers
1981 births
Living people
21st-century English singers